Renato Brioschi (born 20 April 1948), also known as Renato dei Profeti, is an Italian singer, composer, musician and producer.

Born in Milan, the son of the sculptor Remo, Brioschi was founder, frontman and singer of the musical group I Profeti, with whom he got several hits in the late 1960s. In 1970 he recorded, with the name "Renato dei Profeti", ″Lady Barbara″; the song won the Un disco per l'estate festival and peaked at first place on the Italian hit parade, and following the success of the song Brioschi left the group to pursue a solo career. The same year he debuted as actor starring in Lady Barbara, a musicarello named after the song and directed by Mario Amendola.

After some successful singles, in 1974 Brioschi debuted as singer-songwriter with the song "Giochi senza età", which became a hit in France. In the following years he focused into composing and producing, and was the author of several hits for Alice, Eros Ramazzotti, Mia Martini, Fausto Leali, Viola Valentino among others. In the late 1980s he reprised his activity as a singer, first with his former group I Profeti for a short-lived reunion, later as a soloist.

References

External links
 
 

1948 births
Italian male singers
Italian pop singers
Italian composers
Italian male composers
Musicians from Milan
Italian record producers
Living people